

Infantry

Handguns

Submachine guns

Battle/Assault rifles

Machine guns

Sniper rifles

Anti-armor weapons

Grenade launchers

Artillery and Air-defense systems

Vehicles

References

Weapons
Navy weapons
Argentine Navy